Tonoli is an Italian surname. Notable people with this name include the following:

Andrea Tonoli (born 1991), Italian composer and musician
Giovanni Tonoli (born 1947), Italian cyclist

See also

Alessandro Tonolli

Italian-language surnames
Patronymic surnames